Dr. Demento 20th Anniversary Collection is a release by radio disc jockey Dr. Demento to celebrate 20 years since the beginning of his radio career and novelty song show. It covers many of the novelty and comedy songs from the 1950s to the 1980s, such as “Does Your Chewing Gum Lose Its Flavour (On the Bedpost Overnight)” by Lonnie Donegan & His Skiffle Group, to the then recent release of “Eat It” by "Weird Al" Yankovic, whose popularity was boosted by Demento.

Track listing

Disc one

Disc two

Notes 

Novelty albums
1991 compilation albums
Comedy rock compilation albums